Feng Xiating (born September 1964) is a Chinese petrologist who is a professor and vice-president of Northeastern University (China), and currently president of Chinese Society for Rock Mechanics & Engineering (CSRME). He was president of the International Society for Rock Mechanics (ISRM) from 2011 to 2015.

Biography
He received his bachelor's degree and doctor's degree from Northeastern University (China) in 1986 and 1992, respectively. After graduation, the university gave him accelerated promotion to associate professor and to full professor three years later. 

He successively worked as a visiting research fellow at the Institute of Resources and Environment Technology in Japan (September 1995–March 1996), senior research officer at the University of the Witwatersrand (May 1996–November 1996), special researcher at the Japan International Industrial Technology Research Institute (December 1996–November 1997), and academy visitor at the Imperial College London (January 2001–March 2001). In June 2001 he became deputy of the Institute of Rock and Soil Mechanics, Chinese Academy of Sciences (CAS), and two years later he rose to become director. In August 2017 he was recalled to the Northeastern University and appointed vice-president.

Honours and awards
 2004 State Science and Technology Progress Award (Second Class)
 2010 State Science and Technology Progress Award (Second Class)
 2013 State Science and Technology Progress Award (Second Class)
 2017 State Science and Technology Progress Award (Second Class)
 October 4, 2017 Fellow of the International Society for Rock Mechanics (ISRM)
 November 22, 2019 Member of the Chinese Academy of Engineering (CAE)

References

1964 births
Living people
People from Qianshan, Anhui
Engineers from Anhui
Petrologists
Northeastern University (China) alumni
Academic staff of the Northeastern University (China)
Members of the Chinese Academy of Engineering